Jagiot,(ٗUrduجگیوٹ) is a village located in the Islamabad Capital Territory of Pakistan.

References

Union councils of Islamabad Capital Territory
Villages in Islamabad Capital Territory